The 1876 United States presidential election in Maine took place on November 7, 1876, as part of the 1876 United States presidential election. Voters chose seven representatives, or electors to the Electoral College, who voted for president and vice president.

Maine voted for the Republican nominee, Rutherford B. Hayes, over the Democratic nominee, Samuel J. Tilden. Hayes won the state by a margin of 13.99%.

Results

See also
 United States presidential elections in Maine

References

Maine
1876
1876 Maine elections